Solikamsky District is an administrative district (raion), one of the thirty-three in Perm Krai, Russia. Within the framework of municipal divisions, it is incorporated as Solikamsky Municipal District. It is located in the northern central part of the krai. Its administrative center is the town of Solikamsk (which is not administratively a part of the district). Population:

Geography
About 80% of the district's territory is covered by forests, mostly coniferous.

History
The district was established in 1924, but was abolished between 1930 and 1938. In October 1938, it became a part of Perm Oblast.

Administrative and municipal status
Within the framework of administrative divisions, Solikamsky District is one of the thirty-three in the krai. The town of Solikamsk serves as its administrative center, despite being incorporated separately as a town of krai significance—an administrative unit with the status equal to that of the districts.

As a municipal division, the district is incorporated as Solikamsky Municipal District. The town of krai significance of Solikamsk is incorporated separately from the district as Solikamsk Urban Okrug.

Demographics
Ethnic composition (as of the 2002 Census):
Russians: 89.8%
Komi peoples: 1.8%
Ukrainians: 1.6%

Economy
The economy of the district is based on agriculture and forestry.

Notable residents 

Aleksandr Kisakov (born 2002), ice hockey player, born in Solikamsk
Pelageya Shajn (1894–1956), astronomer, born in the village of Ostanin

See also
Vilva

References

Notes

Sources

Districts of Perm Krai
States and territories established in 1924
States and territories disestablished in 1930
States and territories established in 1938